These are the official results of the women's 400 metres event at the 1980 Summer Olympics in Moscow. The competition was held on July 25, 1980, and on July 28, 1980.

Final
Held on Monday July 28, 1980

Semifinals
Held on Sunday July 27, 1980

Heats
Held on Friday July 25, 1980

See also
 1976 Women's Olympic 400 metres (Montreal)
 1978 Women's European Championships 400 metres (Prague)
 1982 Women's European Championships 400 metres (Athens)
 1983 Women's World Championships 400 metres (Helsinki)
 1984 Women's Olympic 400 metres (Los Angeles)

References

External links
Results

 4
400 metres at the Olympics
1980 in women's athletics
Women's events at the 1980 Summer Olympics